Football Club Étoile-Sporting is a Swiss football club, based in La Chaux-de-Fonds. It was founded in 1898.. The club plays in red shirts, black short and red socks and are currently in the 2. Liga.

Honours 
 Swiss Super League
 Winners (1):   1919

External links 
  

Football clubs in Switzerland
Association football clubs established in 1898
La Chaux-de-Fonds
1898 establishments in Switzerland